A Yes man is a sycophant; an obsequious assistant or enabler. 

Yes Man or Yes Men may refer to:

Books
 Yes Man (book), a semi-autobiographical novel by Danny Wallace; basis for the 2008 film

Film and TV 
 Yes Man (film), a 2008 American comedy starring Jim Carrey
 The Yes Man, a 1991 Italian drama film
 The Yes Men (film), a 2003 documentary about the culture-jamming duo
 Yes Man (Kappa Mikey), a fictional character in the animated TV series Kappa Mikey
 Yes Man, a sycophantic robot who appears in Fallout: New Vegas, and is voiced by Dave Foley
 Yes Guy, a fictional character in the animated TV series The Simpsons

Music
"Yes Man", theme Song - Yes Man soundtrack by Zooey Deschanel
 "Yes Man" (song), a 2010 song by Bjørn Johan Muri
 "Yes Man" (Ben Folds song)
 The Yes-Men, an Australian high energy rock band

Other
 The Yes Men, a culture-jamming activist duo

See also 
 Frank Nelson (actor), known for his "EEE-Yeeeeeeeeesssss?" catch-phrase